The Zendmasts of Ruiselede were eight  high guyed radio masts at Ruiselede, Belgium, built in 1923 for carrying an aerial for VLF transmission (nominal frequency 16.2 kHz). On 30 December 1933, an Imperial Airways aircraft crashed into a mast and demolished it. Most of the masts were blown up by German troops in October 1940.

The masts were designed by the Belgian engineer Arthur Vierendeel.

External links
 http://www.zenitel.biz/CSS/02_about_us/2_history/pdf/BoekSait_Ne_Fr.pdf 
 http://www.mil.be/vox/subject/index.asp?LAN=fr&ID=525&MENU=735&PAGE=2
 http://www.seefunker.de/homepage/belgien5.htm
 https://web.archive.org/web/20050219143733/http://users.skynet.be/dezande/radio.htm
 http://users.telenet.be/karel.roose/vierendeel/structuren.html 

Radio masts and towers in Europe
Buildings and structures in West Flanders
Towers in Belgium
Demolished buildings and structures in Belgium
Buildings and structures demolished in 1940
Towers completed in 1923
1923 establishments in Belgium
1940 disestablishments in Belgium